RTL-TVI is a private French-language Luxembourg based television station in Belgium owned by DPG Media and Groupe Rossel, it was originally owned by the RTL Group until 31 March 2022. Within the French-speaking area of Belgium, it is the most popular channel with a 20 percent viewing share. It was the first commercial television station in Belgium.

RTL-TVI offers a schedule of family-oriented information, entertainment and fiction genres. In French-speaking Belgium, almost all of the foreign programs are dubbed in French, instead of retaining the original soundtrack.

In Belgium, RTL also operates the French-language channels Club RTL, Kidz RTL and Plug RTL.

History
Since 1955, Télé-Luxembourg, which became RTL Television in 1982, is broadcast from the Dudelange transmitter in Luxembourg. Following the collision of a Belgian military plane with the transmitter on 31 July 1981, the Compagnie Luxembourgeoise de Télédiffusion (CLT) obtained compensation from the Belgian government. The state monopoly on television broadcasting was lifted.

On 12 September 1983 the Belgian version of the JTL show, presented by Jean-Charles De Keyser, Eddy de Wilde and Bibiane Godfroid, was launched from a small studio in Roosevelt villa, Brussels. In December 1985, CLT created a Belgian company called TVI SA, which produced programs and sold advertising space specifically for RTL Belgium.

Belgian TV channel RTL became independent on 12 September 1987 with the launch of RTL-TVI (Télévision Indépendante), which now produces all its programming in Brussels. This was the first independent channel in the French Community of Belgium. The registration by the Government of the French Community on 21 December 1987 enabled it to legally access the Belgian TV advertising market, through its subsidiary IPB. This monopoly was broken in 1989 when the government allowed commercial advertising on RTBF channels.

Programming

60 secondes chrono (Belgian French version)
Belgium's Got Talent (Belgian French version)
L'Amour est dans le pré (Belgian French version)
Le Juste Prix (Belgian French version)
Place Royale

Un dîner presque parfait (Belgian French version)

References

External links

 

Television channels in Belgium
Television channels and stations established in 1987
French-language television stations in Belgium
Television in Luxembourg
Mass media in Luxembourg